Norman Burton (December 5, 1923 – November 29, 2003) was an American actor. He was occasionally credited as Normann Burton.

Early life
Born in New York City, Burton was a student of the Actors Studio. After early work on stage, he broke into films with a minor role in Fright (1956).

Career
His career in film and television was long and relatively successful, but he never achieved major recognition. He played the Hunt Leader, a gorilla, in the science fiction film Planet of the Apes, notable as being the first ape to be seen by both Taylor and the audience, and also appeared as a (human) army officer in the second sequel Escape from the Planet of the Apes (1971). In film, he is perhaps best known for his performance as Felix Leiter in the James Bond film Diamonds Are Forever (1971). He played Will Giddings, an ill-fated engineer, in the action film The Towering Inferno (1974), and his later films included The Gumball Rally (1976), Crimes of Passion (1984) and Deep Space (1988). He played Dennis Christopher's mean and ill-fated boss in the slasher Fade To Black (1980).

On television, he is best known for his performance as Inter-Agency Defense Command's supervisor Joe Atkinson during the second season of the DC Comics-based fantasy adventure drama series The New Adventures of Wonder Woman starring Lynda Carter. He also played Burt Dennis in the situation comedy The Ted Knight Show in the spring of 1978, and appeared as General George Marshall in the 1988 television miniseries War and Remembrance. Throughout his life, Burton was a devotee of the method school of acting, and taught method acting in Lakeside, California.
He also known for playing the part of Dr. Green (Natalie’s father) in the television series The Facts of Life.

Death
Burton was just six days short of his 80th birthday when he died as a result of an auto accident while returning from Ajijic, Mexico near the California-Arizona state line.

Selected filmography

 1957 Fright as Reporter Thompkins
 1960 Pretty Boy Floyd as Bill Courtney
 1962 Hand of Death as Chief Homicide Investigator
 1962 Womanhunt as Unknown
 1965 Gunsmoke as Ed
 1967 Wild Seed as Policeman
 1967 Valley of the Dolls as Neely O'Hara's Director (uncredited)
 1968 Planet of the Apes as Hunt Leader
 1970 R. P. M. as Coach McCurdy
 1971 Jud as Uncle Hornkel
 1971 Simon, King of the Witches as Willard Rackum
 1971 Escape from the Planet of the Apes as Army Officer
 1971 Diamonds Are Forever as Felix Leiter
 1972 Fuzz as Police Commissioner Nelson
 1973 Save the Tiger as Fred Mirrell
 1973 Hit! as Director 
 1974 The Terminal Man as Captain Anders
 1974 The Towering Inferno as Will Giddings
 1975 The Reincarnation of Peter Proud as Dr. Frederick Spear
 1976 The Gumball Rally as Lieutenant Roscoe
 1976 Scorchy as Chief Frank O'Brien
 1977 Murder in Peyton Place as Jay Kamens 
 1980 Fade to Black as Marty Berger
 1981 Amy as Caruthers
 1983 Mausoleum as Dr. Simon Andrews
 1984 Crimes of Passion as Lou Bateman
 1985 Pray for Death as Lieutenant Anderson
 1986 Bad Guys as Captain Watkins
 1988 Bloodsport as CID Agent Helmer
 1988 Deep Space General Randolph
 1992 Live Wire as Senator Victor
 1993 American Ninja V as U.S. Ambassador On Caracas Halden (final film role)

References

External links
 
 
 
 Norman Burton at FelixLeiter.com

1923 births
American male stage actors
American male film actors
American male television actors
Male actors from New York City
Road incident deaths in Mexico
2003 deaths
20th-century American male actors